North Caucasus Krai (Severo-Kavkazskiy kray) was an administrative division (krai) within the Russian Soviet Federative Socialist Republic of the Soviet Union.  It was established on 17 October 1924.  Its administrative center was Rostov-on-Don until 10 January 1934, Pyatigorsk until January 1936, then Ordzhonikidze (today Vladikavkaz) and, from 15 December 1936, Voroshilovsk (today Stavropol).

As of 1932, the population of the krai was estimated at 10,290,000 in an area of 351,800 km2. 45.9% of the overall population was Russian, and 37.2% of the overall population was Ukrainian.

Widespread death by starvation occurred in the krai during the Soviet famine of 1932–33.

As of the 1937 All-Union Census, the krai had a population of 1,635,277 in a smaller area.

After undergoing numerous administrative changes, including the loss of the majority of its territory to the new Azov-Black Sea Krai on 10 January 1934, it was renamed Ordzhonikidze Krai, after Sergo Ordzhonikidze, on 13 March 1937, and Stavropol Krai on 12 January 1943.

Since 19 January 2010, the region has been divided between the North Caucasian Federal District and the Southern Federal District.

See also
Kuban

References

Former administrative units of Russia